The Kabingo–Kasulu–Manyovu–Mugina–Rumonge Road is a road in  Tanzania, connecting the towns of Kabingo, Kasulu and Manyovu in Tanzania to Mugina in Burundi.

Location
The geographical coordinates of this road in the town of Kasulu are 04°34'24.0"S, 30°05'49.0"E (Latitude:-4.573333; Longitude:30.096944).

Overview
The highway is expected to improve cross-border trade, tourism, socio-economic development and promote regional integration. The project is being handled directly by the East African Community. The road is also expected to ease the movement of traffic from both Dar es Salaam and Tanga ports, destined for the land-locked countries of Burundi, and Democratic Republic of the Congo.

Upgrade to double carriageway
Related to the upgrade of this  road in Tanzania, a  section of highway in Burundi between Rumonge and Gitaza, both located on the eastern shores of Lake Tanganyika will be rehabilitated. In addition, a one-stop-border-post (OSBP) crossing between Manyovu on the Tanzania side and Mugina on the Burundi side will be constructed, to ease the flow of goods and people across the common border.

The upgrade to class II bitumen, widening to double carriageway and related improvements, will be jointly funded by the African Development Bank (AfDB), and the two respective governments. In November 2018, the AfDB committed to lend US$322.5 million towards the development of this road.

See also
 List of roads in Burundi
 List of roads in Tanzania
 East African Community

References

External links
 Webpage of the East African Community
 African Development Fund approves US$322 million for road upgrading project in Burundi and Tanzania As of 22 november 208.

Roads in Burundi
Roads in Tanzania
Geography of Burundi
Geography of Tanzania
Transport in Burundi
Transport in Tanzania
East African Community